The 2011 Avon Tyres British GT season was the 19th season of the British GT Championship. The season began on 25 April at Oulton Park and finished on 8 October at Silverstone, after ten races at seven meetings.

On 22 November 2010, the SRO Motorsports Group announced changes to the structure of the 2011 season including a reduced calendar, however still with the inclusion of an overseas event. TV coverage continued to be broadcast on Channel 4 with the option to view again on 4oD and also on Motors TV.

Rule changes

Class restructure and new homologations
For the 2011 season, the GT3 class was brought right up to date with the inclusion of new FIA homologated cars. This gave teams the options to run the new Ferrari 458 Italia or the Mercedes-Benz SLS AMG GT3 as well as the currently homologated cars. New to 2011 season was the introduction of the GT3B class catering for older, GT3 spec cars which do not conform to the latest FIA homologations. This should allow the running of cars such as the Dodge Viper Competition Coupe or Ferrari F430.

For the second year in a row, the GT4 class was a merger of Supersport-spec cars and GT4 homologated cars. Despite an unsuccessful return the previous year, the Cup class is to be continued. The cars eligible are the cars currently used in the Porsche Supercup and Ferrari Challenge series, based on the Porsche 997 and Ferrari F430 road cars. It is hoped that the Porsche Carrera Cup Great Britain's using updated cars will increase entries.

The ballast penalty system has been dropped in favour of a pit-stop time penalty formula where more successful driver pairings will be held during pit-stops for a longer time in order to level the competition. There are also plans for the development of a "Gentleman's Trophy", new logo and rebranding of the championship.

Entry list
A list of expected entries was released on 8 March 2011 after the championship's Media Day at Silverstone.

Calendar
A provisional 12-race calendar was announced on 22 November 2010. This was then refined on 16 February 2011. All races except Belgian round at Spa, were held in the United Kingdom.

Championship standings
Points were awarded as follows:

GT3/GT3B/GTC

† — Drivers did not finish the race, but were classified as they completed over 90% of the race distance.

GT4

References

External links
British GT website

GT
British GT Championship seasons